Rajamalli is a 1965 Indian Malayalam film,  directed and produced by R. S. Prabhu. The film stars Prem Nazir, Sharada, Sukumari and Kottayam Santha in the lead roles. The film had musical score by BA Chidambaranath.

Cast

Prem Nazir
Sharada
Sukumari
Kottayam Santha
Subhadra
T. S. Muthaiah
Malathi
Abbas
G. K. Pillai
J. A. R. Anand
Paravoor Bharathan

Soundtrack
The music was composed by B. A. Chidambaranath and the lyrics were written by P. Bhaskaran.

References

External links
 

1965 films
1960s Malayalam-language films